The Copa do Brasil 1997 was the 9th staging of the Copa do Brasil.

The competition started on February 18, 1997, and concluded on May 22, 1997, with the second leg of the final, held at the Estádio do Maracanã in Rio de Janeiro, in which Grêmio lifted the trophy for the third time after a 2-2 draw with Flamengo.

Paulo Nunes, of Grêmio, with 9 goals, was the competition's topscorer.

Format
The preliminary round was disputed by 26 clubs, while the first stage was disputed by 32 clubs, including the ones qualified from the preliminary stage. The competition was disputed in a knock-out format. In the preliminary stage and in the first round if the away team won the first leg with an advantage of at least two goals, the second leg was not played and the club automatically qualified to the next round. The following rounds were played over two legs and the away goals rule was used.

Competition stages

Preliminary round

|}

Knockout stages

References
 Copa do Brasil 1997 at RSSSF
Enciclopédia do Futebol Brasileiro, Volume 2 - Lance, Rio de Janeiro: Aretê Editorial S/A, 2001.

1997
1997 in Brazilian football
1997 domestic association football cups